Carl Emil Petersen (August 24, 1875November 17, 1971) was an American sailor serving in the United States Navy during the Boxer Rebellion who received the Medal of Honor for bravery.

Biography
Petersen was born August 24, 1875, in Hamburg, Germany, and after entering the navy in 1898 he was sent as a Chief Machinist to China to fight in the Boxer Rebellion. He left the navy in 1902.

He died November 17, 1971, and is buried in Clover Leaf Memorial Park in Woodbridge, New Jersey.

Medal of Honor citation
Rank and organization: Chief Machinist, U.S. Navy. Place and date: Peking, China, 28 June to 17 August 1900. Entered service at: New Jersey. Born: 24 August 1875, Hamburg, Germany. G.O. No.: 55, 19 July 1901.

Citation:

In the presence of the enemy during the action at Peking, China, 28 June to 17 August 1900. During this period Chief Machinist Petersen distinguished himself by meritorious conduct.

See also

List of Medal of Honor recipients
List of Medal of Honor recipients for the Boxer Rebellion

References

External links

1875 births
1971 deaths
Military personnel from Hamburg
United States Navy Medal of Honor recipients
United States Navy sailors
American military personnel of the Boxer Rebellion
Emigrants from the German Empire to the United States
German-born Medal of Honor recipients
Boxer Rebellion recipients of the Medal of Honor
Burials in New Jersey